The Castration of The Idiot is a six-track EP by American rock band A Very Loud Death, released independently by the group on August 9, 2016. Recorded between April and June 2016 at The Ministry of Sound in Atlanta, Georgia, the album was engineered by Luke Campolieta and produced by The Ministry and A Very Loud Death.

Background and recording 
Following the limited digital release of their debut single, "Do Away," A Very Loud Death began work on a self-contained, small work concept album. According to Chris Edge, "I wanted to take a chance and do some love songs. At their core The Castration of The Idiot is about the domestication of the self into human mores and tendencies and traditions such as love. So this changed the writing style, and we wanted to play a sound, or sounds, we don't do very often. From there we just wrote out a story of a human being losing the self, hence the symbolism of castration, and that human eventually belonging to the sea of people, using suicide and water as the eventual metaphor. In an odd way, that's how this album views love, or any such tendency."

According to Bryan Peel, "it [The Castration of the Idiot] is a sort of musical sampler. Here is some stuff we can do, but don't do often. Here are some of our tendencies. Here we can go heavy and soft and pretty and strange. It's meant to be its own self contained work within our catalog."

While most of the tracks were being written, the band's drummer left due to scheduling conflicts. With studio time already booked, with less than a month left, the band began auditioning. Eventually they brought in Cole O'Neil Robertson. He learned all six tracks and wrote his parts with only three days practice before the album was recorded.

According to Robertson, "it was very on the fly. There are a lot of things I wish I could change on the EP looking back, but at the same time the purity and rawness of the album is what I enjoy".

While most of the songs fall into heavy rock, they also utilize post-punk, pop, noise rock, reggae, metal, doo-wop, and honky-tonk techniques.

References

2016 EPs